KBLG (910 AM, "ESPN 910 KBLG") is an American sports radio station that broadcasts in the Billings Metro Area. KBLG broadcasts from its tower located just outside the Billings city limits.

Ownership
In June 2006, KBLG was acquired by Cherry Creek Radio from Fisher Radio Regional Group as part of a 24 station deal with a total reported sale price of $33.3 million.

KBLG was owned by Cherry Creek Radio until 2010 when it was acquired by Connoisseur Media along with sister stations KRZN-FM and KRKX-FM.

For the remaining Cherry Creek Radio station KYYA-FM, it was announced on May 24, 2010 that the frequency of 93.3 FM would be operated by Elenbaas Media Inc, while Elenbaas's 730 AM frequency would be operated by Connoisseur Media.

In February 2013, KBLG signed a multi-year agreement with Grizzly Sports Properties to broadcast all University of Montana football and men's basketball games to Billings listeners.

Beginning in 1993, KBLG aired a local morning news program titled "The Montana Morning Report" that featured many local radio personalities over the years including former KBLG News Director Michael Lyon (Runge), who died in late 2009 after a distinguished 15-year career covering local news for KBLG radio. Other personalities on KBLG AM 910 included: Lee Stevens (Williams) who has had a successful career as a Marketing, Sales, & PR Manager for companies like the Bozeman Daily Chronicle, and Zero In Indoor Shooting Center. Lee is now an Outside Sales Rep for Kimball Midwest in the Bozeman/Belgrade area. JP Donovan (Pendleton) served as the program director and co-host of the Morning Report with Lyon from 1994-1999. Other personalities have included: David Bingham, Todd Powers, Joe Gehl, Liz Adams, and Ken Edwards (Adelblue).

2000 - Joe Durso Award for Excellence in Broadcast Journalism - Radio - Best Newscast - Winner — Michael Lyon and Lee Stevens, KBLG, Billings.

KBLG eliminated local radio news in 2010 and now airs a sports talk format with no local programming or personalities on its on-air staff.

Originally 910 AM began broadcasting in 1955 in the Billings radio market during which the station went by the call letters KOYN-AM and for many years had a country music format.

On May 7, 2019, Connoisseur Media announced that it would sell its Billings cluster to Desert Mountain Broadcasting, an entity formed by Connoisseur Billings general manager Cam Maxwell. The sale closed on August 2, 2019.

References

External links

FCC History Cards for KBLG

BLG
Sports radio stations in the United States
Radio stations established in 1955
1955 establishments in Montana